The Macintosh Quadra 700 was a personal computer designed, manufactured and sold by Apple Computer from October 1991 to March 1993. It was introduced alongside the Quadra 900 as the first computers in the Quadra series using Motorola 68040 processor, in order to compete with IBM compatible PCs powered by the Intel i486DX. The Quadra 700 is also the first computer from Apple to be housed in a mini-tower form factor, which in 1991 was becoming a popular alternative to standard desktop-on-monitor cases that were common through the 1980s.

The Quadra 700 was considerably more popular than the Quadra 900 (succeeded after six months by the very similar Quadra 950) that it was sold alongside, due to the 900/950 being expensive and bulky with its full tower case. The Quadra 700 originally had a list price of US$5,700, but had dropped to under $4,700 for a base model by the time its replacement, the Macintosh Quadra 800, went on sale in early 1993.  The Centris 650, also introduced around the same time, offered similar performance to the Quadra 700 but in a desktop-style case with more expansion options while its entry-level configuration had a price point closer to $3,000.

Hardware 

Form factor: The Quadra 700 case is largely the same as the popular Macintosh IIcx and Macintosh IIci models; this made it possible for users of those models to upgrade to the more powerful Quadra 700. Users sometimes placed the older case vertically in a mini-tower orientation and the Quadra 700 recognized this by having the Apple logo and model name printed in the vertical orientation. The IIcx and IIci were designed to allow their rubber feet to be moved to the side for vertical orientation as well.

CPU: Motorola 68040 @ 25 MHz. The clock oscillator runs at 50 MHz; replacing it with a faster oscillator (up to 74 MHz) results in a performance increase.

Memory: The Quadra 700 could be upgraded to 68 megabytes of RAM, which with its 25 MHz processor made it a very useful computer for scientific or design work.

Expansion: Two Nubus slots and a Processor Direct Slot; processor upgrades from Apple and other manufacturers were sold for the 700 when the PowerPC 601 accelerator cards came along in 1994.

Storage: 80 and 160 MB hard disks were available at launch.  A faster 230 MB unit became available in mid-1992 when the Quadra 950 was introduced.

Video: Like the IIci, the 700 has integrated graphics built into the system board but, unlike the earlier model, it uses dedicated VRAM for its video memory.  The onboard video came with 512 kilobytes of VRAM soldered to the motherboard, and supported resolutions up to 1152x870. The video memory was expandable to 2 megabytes via six 256-kilobyte 100ns VRAM SIMMs in each of the VRAM SIMM expansion slots on the motherboard. Expanding the video memory to 2 megabytes allowed for 24-bit (Millions) color at resolutions up to 832x624.

Sound: 8-bit stereo, 22 KHz.

Ports: I/O was available with dual serial ports, two ADB ports, an AAUI ethernet port, mono audio in, stereo audio out, and a DB-25 SCSI connector.  The Quadra 700, along with the 900, are the first Macintosh models with built-in support for Ethernet networking.

Operating system: System 7.0.1 was included as standard. This is the earliest Macintosh model to support Mac OS 8.

The Quadra 700 uses tantalum capacitors on the logic board, rather than electrolytic capacitors which can leak fluid.

In popular culture
 The Quadra 700, alongside an SGI Crimson running IRIX, was featured in the film Jurassic Park (1993).

Timeline

References

External links 

700
Quadra 700
Quadra 700
Quadra 700
Computer-related introductions in 1991